Free is the fourth album from gospel group, Virtue. Singles released off the album include, "Healin'", "Lord I Lift My Hands", and "You Just Be You"

Track listing
Only God's In This - 2:56
Healin' - 3:33
Jesus Paid The Ransom - 3:31
Free - 4:11
Thankful - 3:50
You'll Win If You Try - 4:28
Lord I Lift My Hands - 3:35
Worthy - 3:32
Interlude - You Just Be You - 0:39
You Just Be You - 3:31
He's Able - 3:07
Everything Will Be Alright - 3:29
Open Arms - 3:41
Nothing Else I Can Do - 4:02
You Just Be You (remix) [Bonus Track] - 3:36

Charts

References

 

Virtue (musical group) albums
2003 albums